APG is a Dutch pension investment company based in the Netherlands. It is a direct subsidiary of Stichting Pensioenfonds ABP,  the largest pension fund in the Netherlands.

History
APG was established on 1 March 2008 as an independent administration organization of Stichting Pensioenfonds ABP (ABP). In the same year, it merged with Cordares, which carried out pension administration for bpfBOUW (The Foundation for the Construction Industry Pension Fund). APG is known as the asset manager of ABP.

AlpInvest Partners was owned by APG and PGGM until it was sold to The Carlyle Group in 2011.

Overview
APG manages investments for various pension funds in the Netherlands.

It has three subsidiaries which are:

 APG Rechtenbeheer (management advice, pension administration and pension communication)  
 APG Asset Management  
 APG Diensten (in-house service provider)

APG has offices in Amsterdam, Heerlen, Brussels, New York, and Hong Kong as well as satellite sites in Beijing and Shanghai.

Notable transactions
 In 2010, APG and CPPIB each purchased a 25% shareholding in Westfield Stratford City for £871.5m each.
In 2011, ConnectEast was acquired by Horizon Roads in 2011 with APG having a 15% shareholding
In 2019, Capco plc sold their interest in the Earls Court Exhibition Centre to APG and Delancey for £425 million.
In 2019, APG acquired a 41.1 per cent indirect interest in Alpha Trains and acquired an additional 20.9% interest in 2021.
 In 2019, CPPIB sold its 39% stake in European car park manager, Interparking to APG.
 In 2020, APG along with NPS and Swiss Life Asset Managers acquired 81% stake in Portugal motorway operator, Brisa.

Affiliated people
 Guy Verhofstadt - Prime Minister of Belgium (1999 to 2008)
 Bart le Blanc - Chairman of the Investment Committee of the United Nations

See also
 Stichting Pensioenfonds ABP

References

External links
Official website

Financial services companies established in 2008
Public pension funds
Investment management companies of the Netherlands